Anne Plantagenet (1972, Joigny (Yonne) is a French novelist and translator from Spanish.

She translated her first novel from Spanish in 1994 and published her first book in 1998. Since then, she has continued to write, translate and publish, exploring all genres.

In 2012, she was awarded the Prix Contrepoint for her novel Nation Pigalle published the previous year.

Works 
1998: Un coup de corne fut mon premier baiser, novel, Ramsay
2005: Seule au rendez-vous, novel, Robert Laffont, Prix du récit biographique 2005.
2005: Manolete, biographie, Ramsay, Prix de la ville d'Hossegor 2006. 
2007: Marilyn Monroe, biography, Folio Biographies, 
2008: Onze femmes, short stories, collective work, J'ai lu
2008: Pour les siècles des siècles, short stories, Stock, J'ai lu, 2009. 
2009: Le Prisonnier, novel, Stock, J'ai lu, 2011. 
2011: Nation Pigalle, novel, Stock, J'ai lu, 2014. , Prix Contrepoint
2014: Trois jours à Oran, Stock, followed by Le désir et la peur, J'ai lu, 2015.
2015: La Vraie Parisienne, J'ai lu
2016: Appelez-moi Lorca Horowitz, novel, Stock

Translations 
2008: Une semaine en octobre, Elizabeth Subercaseaux, novel, Chile, Flammarion
2009: L'Infini dans la paume de la main, Gioconda Belli, novel, Nicaragua, Jacqueline Chambon
2010: L'Enfant poisson, Lucia Puenzo, novel, Argentina, Stock La Cosmopolite
2010: Savoir perdre, David Trueba, novel, Spain, Flammarion
2011: La Malédiction de Jacinta, Lucía Puenzo, novel, Argentina, Stock La Cosmopolite
2011: Les Révoltés de Cordoue, Ildefonso Falcones, novel, Spain, Robert Laffont
2012: Cœur de napalm, Clara Usón, novel, Spain, JC Lattès
2012: La Fureur de la langouste, Lucía Puenzo, Argentina, Stock
2013: Wakolda, Lucía Puenzo, Argentina, Stock
2013: Quand nous étions révolutionnaires, Roberto Ampuero, Chile, Lattès
2014 :La fille de l'Est, Clara Usón, Spain, Gallimard
2015: De chair et d'os, Dolores Redondo, Spain, Mercure de France
2016: Les trois mariages de Manolita, Almudena Grandes, Spain, Jean-Claude Lattès
2016: Blitz, David Trueba, Spain, Flammarion

References 

1972 births
Living people
Spanish–French translators
21st-century French non-fiction writers
People from Yonne
21st-century French women writers
21st-century translators